The 1946 SANFL Grand Final was an Australian rules football championship game.   beat  92 to 64.

References 

SANFL Grand Finals
SANFL Grand Final, 1946